Carol Swiedler (stage name Carol Richards or Carole Richards) (June 6, 1922 – March 16, 2007) was an American singer, radio and television performer, best remembered for her duets with Bing Crosby on the hit single "Silver Bells" and the song "Sunshine Cake."

Early years 
The daughter of George and Martha Vosburgh, Richards was born Carol June Vosburgh in Harvard, Illinois. She had three siblings. Her father worked for the Northwestern Railroad. She began performing at age 4, but within a couple of years her mother thought she was acting "like a diva", and wouldn't let her take the stage again until she was 11.

Radio
Richards worked as an actress at a radio station in Indianapolis, Indiana, until she had to sing in one of her roles. "The station offered me a job as a vocalist, and I took it," she said. "And I've been singing ever since."

Television 
At the start of her career in her early 20s, Richards won a Bob Hope talent contest, moved to Hollywood and appeared on numerous TV shows including I Love Lucy, Name That Tune, The Saturday Night Revue, and variety shows hosted by Dennis Day,  Edgar Bergen, and Ezio Pinza.

Richards was a regular cast member on The Pinky Lee Show (April 5, 1950 - November 9, 1950), both singing and playing Lee's girlfriend; on The Ralph Edwards Show (January 14, 1952 - May 16, 1952) and on The Bob Crosby Show (1953–1957).

Film 
In the film The Petty Girl (1950), Richards supplied the singing voices for both Joan Caulfield and Movita Castaneda. She also was the voice double for Vera Ellen in Call Me Madam (1953), for Cyd Charisse in Silk Stockings, Brigadoon (1954), Deep in My Heart (1954), and It's Always Fair Weather, and for Betta St. John in The Robe.

Recording
In 1949, Richards signed a contract with Decca Records. Her first recording on that label (Decca 24680) featured "I Wish I Had a Wishbone". She was accompanied by Sonny Burke and his orchestra. A review in the trade publication Billboard commented, "New Decca thrush makes a satisfactory debut with an infectious little rhythm ditty." In 1950, Richards and Bing Crosby recorded "Sunshine Cake" (Decca 24846). They were accompanied by Victor Young's orchestra and Jeff Alexander's chorus.

Richards' voice was featured on the soundtrack recording from The Robe (1953). Decca's release of that album resulted in a $400,000 legal suit by Richards against Decca Records and M.C.A. Artists. The suit charged that she recorded the song for use in the film and did not authorize any other use of it.

In 1956, Richards recorded Intrigue (Victor 6562) for RCA Victor. The song was the theme from the film Foreign Intrigue (1956).

Personal appearances 
Richards worked frequently with Danny Kaye, Jerry Lewis, and Bob Hope, and sang with the Russ Morgan and Desi Arnaz Bands. In December 1951, Richards accompanied ventriloquist Edgar Bergen and accordionist Domenick Frontiere on a 10-day tour of 14 military hospitals in the United States. Dubbed "Operation Santa Claus," the tour also distributed 10,000 pounds of gifts that people across the country had donated to patients in the hospitals. A 1955 newspaper article about Richards reported, "She's drawn a big hand as featured attraction at Ciro's, The Shamrock Hotel, and other swank night spots."

In the 1960s after moving to Chicago, Richards performed at numerous club dates, and appeared frequently on Don McNeill's radio show, The Breakfast Club.

Later years 
Richards gave up her career after marrying Edward Swiedler.

Following her performing career, Richards continued her work as an artist, completing numerous sculptures, pastels, and oil paintings as well as publishing a book Letters from the Cosmos with her husband.

Personal life 
Richards' first marriage to Bayard Lutzhoff occurred at age 16 (5 weeks before she turned 17). She took the stage name, Richards in honor of a favorite nephew. Her marriage to Lutzhoff ended in divorce in 1948. In 1950 she married Carl Altman. That marriage ended in divorce in 1952. In 1957, while on tour in Chicago she met and married dentist Andrew Mitran. They had two children. Mitran died of a brain tumor in 1961. In 1962, Carol married Howard Kamin. They had one child and moved to Boston. The couple were divorced in 1967. She then married Edward Swiedler. The Swiedlers were married 40 years until her death. Richards had 5 children, 19 grandchildren, and eight great-grandchildren.

Death
On March 16, 2007, Richards died of kidney failure at the Indian River Memorial Hospital in Vero Beach, Florida at the age of 84.

References

External links
 
 Letters from the Cosmos on Amazon

1922 births
2007 deaths
20th-century American singers
People from Harvard, Illinois
20th-century American women singers
21st-century American women
American radio actresses